The Museum of Scottish Railways is a railway museum operated by the Scottish Railway Preservation Society. It is based on the Society's large collection of railway artefacts from across Scotland. The museum is located at the SRPS's headquarters at Bo'ness, and is the largest building on site.

It is the largest railway museum in Scotland, consisting of three large buildings which contain heritage locomotives, carriages and other exhibits.

References

External links 

Railway museums in Scotland
Bo'ness